Paul Bevan Lieberstein (born February 22, 1967) is an American actor, screenwriter, television director and television producer. A Primetime Emmy Award winner, he is best known as writer, as executive producer, and as supporting cast member Toby Flenderson on the NBC sitcom The Office. He served as the series' showrunner from seasons five to eight.

Early life
Lieberstein grew up in West Hartford, Connecticut, the son of Judith and Stanley Lieberstein. He is Jewish.

He attended Conard High School where he wrote his first sitcom with some friends and played the vibraphone in band. He then attended Hamilton College, where he joined Chi Psi and graduated in 1989 with a major in economics (he "wanted to be a financier of some kind"). Lieberstein wrote references to the fact that Office character Andy Bernard was a Chi Psi from Cornell into the storyline of several episodes of the show.

After college, Lieberstein moved to New York City, where his first job was as an auditor at Peat Marwick International, a job that lasted six months. He followed that with part-time work at his father's law firm, "working as little as [he] could so [he] could write".

Career
Lieberstein and a writing partner got an agent with William Morris and moved to Los Angeles, living just off Hollywood Boulevard. He landed his first writing job on Clarissa Explains It All, but was fired after one season when he and his writing partner split up.

Lieberstein then had short stints in a few other writer rooms, including Weird Science and The Naked Truth, before his brother-in-law Greg Daniels asked him to join the King of the Hill staff.

Lieberstein served as a co-executive producer for 25 episodes in Season 6 of The Drew Carey Show, and also served as a supervising producer for two episodes in that season: the season opening "Drew Pops Something on Kate" (which he also wrote, along with "Drew and the Motorcycle" and "Drew and the Activist, Part I"), and "Buzzie Wuzzie Liked His Beer".

Lieberstein also worked as producer on the third and final season of the television drama series The Newsroom. In November 2017, it was announced that he would replace Kevin Etten as showrunner of Ghosted. In 2018, Lieberstein wrote and directed his first feature film, Song of Back and Neck, which made it into Tribeca Film Festival. On April 3, 2020, he announced plans for a sitcom about office life while isolated due to the COVID-19 pandemic; the project eventually became the television film Out of Office.

The Office
On June 12, 2008, Variety magazine reported that Lieberstein would become one of the executive producers of The Office. He worked in the writer's room from the start of the US adaptation and was asked by Greg Daniels to act as well, as Daniels wanted some of the writers to know what it was like on the other side of the camera. Lieberstein has said he "attended 'The Office' acting school" and was often thrown by Steve Carell's improv during scenes.

On March 22, 2012, it was announced that Lieberstein would step down from his showrunner role to focus on a planned spin-off series featuring Rainn Wilson as Dwight Schrute, tentatively called The Farm. Lieberstein was set to be the showrunner, but in October 2012, it was announced that NBC was not accepting the series.

In a SuicideGirls interview, Lieberstein said that "as an actor, which is just a very small percentage of me, I don’t feel Toby while I’m writing. It’s the hardest of the characters to access". In an interview for his alma mater, Hamilton College, he commented on the bigger picture:

Personal life
Lieberstein's sister Susanne was the president of programming for YouTube Premium (previously holding this position at MTV), and is married to screenwriter and producer Greg Daniels. His brother, Warren Lieberstein, was married to his co-star Angela Kinsey. His cousin, Paul Faust, inspired and portrayed "Cool Guy Paul", as seen in The Office episode "Chair Model".

Lieberstein was married for a second time, to Janine Serafin Poreba, on July 19, 2008, at the New York City restaurant Battery Gardens. They reside in the Brentwood neighborhood of Los Angeles, California.

Lieberstein has served on the advisory board of directors for Young Storytellers, an arts education nonprofit organization based in Los Angeles.

Awards
Lieberstein's first Emmy Award was as a producer, sharing a 1999 Emmy for "Outstanding Animated Program (For Programming One Hour or Less)" for his work in King of the Hill.

Lieberstein's work on The Office has resulted in numerous awards. In June 2007, Lieberstein shared in a Daytime Emmy Award for "Outstanding Broadband Program – Comedy", for his work on The Office: Accountants webisodes. As an actor, Lieberstein shared in a 2006 Screen Actors Guild Award for "Outstanding Performance by an Ensemble in a Comedy Series"; as a writer, he shared a 2006 Writers Guild of America Award for the series, in addition to a WGA Award nomination for "The Coup". As co-executive producer, he shared a 2006 Emmy Award for "Outstanding Comedy Series".

Lieberstein received an Honorary Doctorate of Fine Arts degree from Hamilton College on May 22, 2011.

Filmography

Acting

Directing

Writing

Producing

References

External links
 

1967 births
American male screenwriters
American male television actors
Television producers from New York (state)
American television directors
American television writers
Living people
Male actors from Connecticut
People from Westport, Connecticut
Hamilton College (New York) alumni
Emmy Award winners
Daytime Emmy Award winners
Writers Guild of America Award winners
21st-century American male actors
American male television writers
Jewish American male actors
Screenwriters from Connecticut
Screenwriters from New York (state)
Staples High School alumni
21st-century American screenwriters
21st-century American male writers
Jewish American screenwriters
20th-century American screenwriters
20th-century American male writers
Television producers from Connecticut
21st-century American Jews